Emmalocera simplicipalpis is a species of snout moth in the genus Emmalocera. It was described by Embrik Strand in 1920. It is found in Taiwan.

References

Moths described in 1920
Emmalocera